Spider Cave is a limestone cave in the British Overseas Territory of Gibraltar. It is located within the Upper Rock Nature Reserve.

Description
This is the highest of the caves accessed along Mediterranean Steps, a footpath which gives access to the summit of the Rock of Gibraltar. The cave was created from water running down the fissure below Lord Airey's Battery. Most of the cave's speleothems were lost during World War II when the cave was widened for military accommodation.

Wildlife
The cave is inhabited by the Gibraltar funnel-web spider. The cave was also used as a roost by a colony of about 100 Schreibers' bats but there was no sign in 2005.

References

Caves of Gibraltar